Flávia Carvalho (born 19 June 1976) is a Brazilian female volleyball player.

She is played for the Brazil women's national volleyball team, at the 2001 FIVB Women's World Grand Champions Cup, and the 2001 FIVB World Grand Prix.

References

External links 
 

Living people
1976 births